Rudolf Pojer (born 27 March 1947) is a Czech former sports shooter. He competed at the 1968 Summer Olympics and the 1972 Summer Olympics.

References

External links
 

1947 births
Living people
Czech male sport shooters
Olympic shooters of Czechoslovakia
Shooters at the 1968 Summer Olympics
Shooters at the 1972 Summer Olympics
People from Znojmo
Sportspeople from the South Moravian Region